Kenneth Boothroyd Jones (born 11 May 1937) is a Welsh former footballer, who played as a full-back. He made appearances in the English Football League with Wrexham, Crystal Palace and Swindon Town.

References

1937 births
Living people
Welsh footballers
Association football defenders
Wrexham A.F.C. players
Crystal Palace F.C. players
Swindon Town F.C. players
Colwyn Bay F.C. players
English Football League players
People from Rhosllanerchrugog
Sportspeople from Wrexham County Borough